Slumming is a 2006 Austrian-Swiss comedy film directed by Michael Glawogger.

Cast 
 Paulus Manker - Franz Kallmann
 August Diehl - Sebastian
 Michael Ostrowski - Alex
 Pia Hierzegger - Pia
 Maria Bill - Herta

References

External links 

2006 comedy films
2006 films
Austrian comedy films
Swiss comedy films